One Life may refer to:

Films and television 
One Life (1958 film), a French film
One Life (2011 film), a documentary film by Michael Gunton and Martha Holmes produced by BBC Earth
One Life (2016 film), a French film
One Life (2023 film), a British biopic
One Coin, a Bulgarian cryptocurrency Ponzi scheme, which uses the network ‘One Life’

Music

Albums 
One Life (33Miles album), 2008
One Life (Johnny Clegg album), 2006
One Life (Mai Kuraki album), 2008
One Life (Elena Paparizou album), 2014

Songs 
"One Life" (Glen Vella song), the Maltese entrant of the Eurovision Song Contest 2011
"One Life" (Hedley song), a 2012 single by Hedley
"One Life" (Madcon song), a 2013 single by Norwegian hip hop duo Madcon
"One Life" (No Angels song), a 2009 single by German pop band No Angels
"One Life" (The Pillows song), a 1997 single by The Pillows
"1 Life" (Xandee song), the Belgian entrant of the Eurovision Song Contest 2004 performed by Xandee
"One Life", song by Christine Campbell	1963
"One Life", song by Glen Goldsmith	1989
"One Life", song by James Morrison from his album The Awakening, 2011
"One Life", song by Justin Bieber from his album Journals, 2013
"One Life", song by Laid Back	1985
"One Life", song by Robert Goulet	1961
"One Life", song on Alter Bridge's 2019 album Walk the Sky
"One Life", song by Ed Sheeran from the 2019 film Yesterday and in the tour edition of his 2021 album =.